Antonio Páez Montero (born 5 September 1956 in Arenas del Rey) is a retired middle distance runner from Spain. He won three medals at the European Indoor Championships. He competed in the men's 800 metres at the 1980 Summer Olympics.

Achievements

References

External links
 Spanish Olympic Committee

Living people
1956 births
Spanish male middle-distance runners
Athletes (track and field) at the 1980 Summer Olympics
Olympic athletes of Spain
20th-century Spanish people